Eleonora Marchiando (born 27 September 1997) is an Italian athlete. She competed in the women's 400 metres event at the 2021 European Athletics Indoor Championships. She competed at the 2020 Summer Olympics, in 400 m hurdles.

National records
 4x400 metres relay indoor: 3:30.32 (Toruń, Poland, 7 March 2021 with Rebecca Borga, Alice Mangione, Eloisa Coiro)

Personal best
400 m hs: 55.68 (Geneva, Switzerland, 12 June 2021)

Achievements

National titles
Marchiando won two national championships at individual senior level.

Italian Athletics Championships
400 m hs: 2021

Italian Athletics Indoor Championships
400 m: 2022

See also
Italian all-time top lists - 400 metres hurdles

References

External links

1997 births
Living people
Italian female sprinters
Sportspeople from Aosta Valley
Athletes (track and field) at the 2020 Summer Olympics
Olympic athletes of Italy
Athletics competitors of Centro Sportivo Carabinieri